Everybody Knows is the third studio album by Canadian country music group Prairie Oyster and was released on September 19, 1991 by RCA Nashville. The album was named Album of the Year by the Canadian Country Music Association in 1992.

Track listing

 "Will I Do (Till the Real Thing Comes Along)" (Joan Besen) - 2:44
 "One Precious Love" (Besen) - 2:10
 "Can't Say Goodbye" (Russell deCarle) - 2:54
 "Am I That Easy to Forget" (Carl Belew, W.S. Stevenson) - 2:40
 "Just for Old Times Sake" (Hank Hunter, Jack Keller) - 2:46
 "Everybody Knows" (Keith Glass, Paul Kennerley) - 2:47
 "Here's to You" (James House, Kostas) - 2:52
 "Did You Fall in Love with Me" (Besen) - 3:36
 "I Think That We Did Something" (Jack DeKeyser) - 3:19
 "Goodbye Lonesome (Hello, Baby Doll)" (Lee Emerson) - 2:32

Personnel
John P. Allen – acoustic guitar, fiddle, mandolin, background vocals
Richard Bennett – guitar, producer
Joan Besen – piano, background vocals
Russell de Carle – electric bass, vocals
Dennis Delorme – pedal steel guitar
Keith Glass – acoustic guitar, electric guitar, vocals
Josh Leo – guitar, producer
Bruce Moffett – percussion, drums

Production
Mary Hamilton – art direction
Jeff Giedt – assistant
Steve Marcantonio – engineer, mixing
Denny Purcell – mastering
Señor McGuire – photography
Ed Stone – engineer
L. Stuart Young – assistant

Chart performance

References

1991 albums
Prairie Oyster albums
RCA Records albums
Albums produced by Josh Leo
Albums recorded at Metalworks Studios
Canadian Country Music Association Album of the Year albums